Universal Learning Academy is a charter school in Westland, Michigan, in the Detroit metropolitan area, serving grades Kindergarten through 12.

History
It was established in 2004 by Hamadeh Educational Services, a company created by Lebanese American woman Nawal Hamadeh.

Previously the school had a main campus and a kindergarten campus, both in Dearborn Heights. The current campus for all grade levels, in Westland, opened on November 18, 2011.

Academics
Universal Learning Academy offers instruction in Arabic to students in grades K-5.

Demographics
According to the National Center for Education Statistics, the enrollment for the 2014–2015 school year was 702 students in kindergarten through twelfth grade. 51.0% were male and 49.0% were female. Native Americans and Alaskans made up 0.1% of the enrollment; Asians and Pacific islanders 1.3%; blacks 9.5%; Hispanics of all racial makeup 1.9%; whites 85.3%. Students claiming a multi-racial background made up 1.9% of the enrollment. 84.6% of the student body were eligible for free or reduced lunch. This is a Title I school.

Nada Saab, Arabic Language Department Director of Hamadeh Educational Services, stated in a letter to the editor published in The Language Educator in 2007 that "over 90% of its students come from Middle Eastern and/or Arabic background."

Athletics
The Universal Learning Academy Blue Jays participate in three Michigan High School Athletic Association sanctioned sports - soccer for boys, volleyball for girls and basketball for both boys and girls. The school colors are blue, gold and white. Universal Learning Academy is not affiliated with a conference.

References

External links
 

Charter schools in Michigan
Public K-12 schools in Michigan
Schools in Wayne County, Michigan
Westland, Michigan
2004 establishments in Michigan